Bari is a Jāti of India, are also known as Rawat. Bari belong to the Other Backward Classes in Delhi, Uttar Pradesh, and Maharashtra.

The Bari speak Awadhi in Uttar Pradesh, Marathi in Maharashtra, Bhojpuri in Bihar and Mewari in Rajasthan. They also speak Hindi in these states and read and write in Devanagari. Literacy in the group is low, Maharashtra being the exception.

The Bari are Hindus and worship most of the Hindu gods like Shiva, Vishnu and Rama. They also worship family and village gods and worship ancestors. They celebrate Hindu festivals such as Holi, Diwali and Dusshera.

References

Indian castes